The eighth season of the animated television series My Little Pony: Friendship Is Magic, developed by Lauren Faust, originally aired on the Discovery Family channel in the United States. The series is based on Hasbro's My Little Pony line of toys and animated works and is often referred by collectors to be the fourth generation, or "G4", of the My Little Pony franchise. Season 8 of the series premiered on March 24, 2018, on Discovery Family, an American pay television channel partly owned by Hasbro, and concluded on October 13.

The season focuses on Twilight running her newly established School of Friendship to teach ponies and creatures from Equestria and beyond about the benefits of friendship with her friends serving as the teachers. However, one of the students, a seemingly innocent pegasus filly named Cozy Glow, is secretly plotting against them.

Development 
On May 25, 2017, supervising director Jim Miller announced via Twitter an eighth season for the series. At Hasbro's first self-themed convention (aptly named HasCon) on September 9, an animatic from an upcoming episode was shown.

On February 8, 2018, Discovery Family's March press release states that this season, "viewers will witness major milestones featuring the introduction of Starlight Glimmer’s parents and Princess Celestia's big acting debut. Additionally, the Mane 6’s Twilight Sparkle, Rarity, Applejack, Pinkie Pie, Rainbow Dash and Fluttershy are accompanied by six new creatures including Ocellus the Changeling, Silverstream the Hippogriff/Seapony, Smolder the Dragon, Gallus the Griffin, Yona the Yak and Sandbar the Pony, joining them on epic adventures throughout new and familiar lands such as Mount Aris, Everfree Forest, Las Pegasus and more. Fan-favorite characters Maud Pie, Spike, the Cutie Mark Crusaders, Queen Chrysalis and Discord return with exciting storylines and a whole lot of magic!"

Cast

Main 
 Tara Strong as Twilight Sparkle
 Rebecca Shoichet as Twilight Sparkle (singing voice)
 Tabitha St. Germain as Rarity
 Kazumi Evans as Rarity (singing voice)
 Ashleigh Ball as Applejack and Rainbow Dash
 Andrea Libman as Fluttershy and Pinkie Pie
 Shannon Chan-Kent as Pinkie Pie (singing voice)
 Cathy Weseluck as Spike

Recurring 

 The Young Six
 Vincent Tong as Sandbar
 Gavin Langelo as Gallus
 Katrina Salisbury as Yona
 Shannon Chan-Kent as Smolder
 Lauren Jackson as Silverstream
 Devyn Dalton as Ocellus
 Kelly Sheridan as Starlight Glimmer
 Nicole Oliver as Princess Celestia
 Tabitha St. Germain as Princess Luna
 The Cutie Mark Crusaders
 Michelle Creber as Apple Bloom
 Madeleine Peters as Scootaloo
 Claire Corlett as Sweetie Belle

Minor

Single roles 

 Maurice LaMarche as Chancellor Neighsay
 Richard Ian Cox as Grampa Gruff
 Garry Chalk as Prince Rutherford
 Ali Milner as Ember
 Kyle Rideout as Thorax
 Caitlyn Bairstow as Blue Bobbin
 Matt Hill as Soarin'
 Kelly Sheridan as Misty Fly
 Colin Murdock as On Stage
 Ian Hanlin as Sunburst
 John de Lancie as Discord
 Rebecca Shoichet as Sugar Belle
 Brenda Crichlow as Zecora
 Sunni Westbrook as Cozy Glow
 Andrea Libman as Bon Bon
 Trevor Devall as Iron Will
 Richard Newman as Cranky Doodle
 Chris Britton as Star Swirl the Bearded
 Sam Vincent as Flim
 Scott McNeil as Flam
 Patricia Drake as Yingrid
 Britt McKillip as Princess Cadance
 Rhona Rees as Rolling Thunder
 Britt Irvin as Lightning Dust
 Kelly Metzger as Spitfire
 Matt Cowlrick as Rockhoof
 Kelli Ogmundson as Professor Fossil
 Giles Panton as Flash Magnus
 Ellen-Ray Hennessy as Mistmane
 Murry Peeters as Somnambula
 Mariee Devereux as Mage Meadowbrook
 Mark Acheson as Lord Tirek

Multiple roles 
 Ingrid Nilson as Maud Pie, Limestone Pie, and Marble Pie
 Peter New as Big McIntosh and Goldie Delicious
 Tabitha St. Germain as Granny Smith, Mrs. Cake, Princess Flurry Heart, and Muffins
 Kathleen Barr as Queen Chrysalis and Trixie Lulamoon

Notes

Guest stars

Single roles 

 Christopher Gaze as Seaspray
 Adam Kirschner as Mudbriar
 Shirley Millner as Apple Rose
 Marcy Goldberg as Applesauce
 Alex Zahara as Jack Pot
 Cole Howard as Terramar
 Brian Dobson as Sky Beak
 Advah Soudack as Ocean Flow
 Adam Greydon Reid as Firelight
 Trish Pattendon as Stellar Flare
 Jason Simpson as Bufogren
 Andrew McNee as Short Fuse
 Rachel Bloom as Autumn Blaze
 Nicole Bouma as Rain Shine
 Dave Pettitt as Sludge

Multiple roles 
 Tariq Leslie as Big Bucks and Hoo'Far

Episodes

Notes

Songs

DVD release 
Equestria Daily reported that while Shout! Factory has not yet released season 8 on DVD or Blu-ray in North America, Myth Entertainment released the entire season on DVD in Malaysia themselves on December 18, 2019.

References 

2018 American television seasons
2018 Canadian television seasons
8